Lucy Penelope Hood is an Australian politician, journalist and former political adviser. She has been the member of the South Australian House of Assembly for Adelaide since March 2022.

Early life and education
Hood grew up in Naracoorte, South Australia and attended Naracoorte High School. She has a Bachelor of Arts (Journalism) from the University of South Australia.

Career
Hood worked as adviser to South Australian premier, Jay Weatherill, from 2016 until his defeat in 2018. She then worked as political adviser to the then South Australian opposition leader, Peter Malinauskas.

Hood has been a Labor member of the South Australian House of Assembly since the 2022 state election, representing Adelaide. She replaced the Liberal minister for Child Protection, Rachel Sanderson, who had held the seat since 2010. She was supported in her campaign by the mentorship of the Victorian Minister for Agriculture, Mary-Anne Thomas, through Emily's List Australia.

Personal life
Hood is married to Jarrad Pilkington, a former media adviser to Jay Weatherill, and they have two children.  Her brother, Ben Hood, stood as Liberal candidate for the seat of Mount Gambier at the 2022 state election, and in February 2023 was accepted to fill a vacant Liberal seat in the Legislative Council.

References 

Living people
Year of birth missing (living people)
Members of the South Australian House of Assembly
Women members of the South Australian House of Assembly
21st-century Australian politicians
Australian Labor Party members of the Parliament of South Australia
21st-century Australian women politicians